Bigwani Shumali is a town and union council of Dera Ismail Khan District in Khyber-Pakhtunkhwa province of Pakistan. It is located at 32°7'60N 71°1'0E and has an altitude of 169 metres (557 feet). Muhammad Rustam Malana is the councler of Bigwani Shumali and Malik Rehmatullah is the Nazim of Bigwani Shumali.

References

Union councils of Dera Ismail Khan District
Populated places in Dera Ismail Khan District